Ricardo Medina Jr. (often referred to as Rick Medina) is an American former actor. He is best known for his role as Cole Evans, the Red Wild Force Ranger on the TV series Power Rangers Wild Force, and later as Deker, the half-human cursed Nighlok in Power Rangers Samurai.  He was in prison for over three years for the voluntary manslaughter of his roommate.

Early life

Ricardo Medina Jr. was born in Kern County, California, and raised in Downey, California. He is of Puerto Rican descent.

Filmography

Killing of Joshua Sutter and conviction
On February 1, 2015, Medina was arrested after he allegedly stabbed to death his 38-year-old roommate, Joshua Sutter, on January 31. Sutter had been stabbed in the abdomen with a medieval "Conan the Barbarian" sword at a home in Green Valley, west of Palmdale, California. Medina called emergency services, and Sutter was pronounced dead upon arrival at a hospital. Medina was initially held on $1 million bail, but no charges were filed against him from the district attorney due to requests on further investigation so he was released on February 3, 2015. Medina claimed that he stabbed Sutter in self-defense after Sutter forced open the door of Medina's bedroom, into which Medina and his girlfriend had retreated after an argument between Medina and Sutter. Medina had lived in the home in Green Valley for approximately two months.

On January 14, 2016, he was arrested again on murder charges in connection with Sutter's death. At that time, Medina faced a possible sentence of life imprisonment with a chance of parole after 26 years with prosecutors planning to ask that Medina be held on $1 million bail.  On March 16, 2017, Medina pled guilty to one felony count of voluntary manslaughter. On March 30, 2017, Medina was sentenced to the maximum 6 years in prison. As of 2020 Medina Jr. has been released from prison as revealed in an interview with Jack Guzman.

References

External links
 
 TV.com profile

21st-century American male actors
21st-century American criminals
American people of Puerto Rican descent
American male film actors
American male television actors
Place of birth missing (living people)
American people convicted of manslaughter
People from Kern County, California
Hispanic and Latino American male actors
Living people
Male actors from Los Angeles
Participants in American reality television series
People from Downey, California
American prisoners and detainees
Prisoners and detainees of California
Year of birth missing (living people)